= Hagelseeli =

Lake in the canton of Bern, Switzerland

- Location within Canton of Bern Location within Switzerland Location within Alps
- Interactive map of Hagelseeli
- Location: Canton of Bern
- Coordinates: 46°40′23″N 8°02′08″E
- Basin countries: Switzerland
- Surface area: 2.49 ha (6.2 acres)
- Max. depth: 18.8 m (62 ft)
- Surface elevation: 2,339 m (7,674 ft)

Hagelseeli or Hagelseewli is a lake in the canton of Bern, Switzerland. Its surface area is 2.49 ha (6.2 acres).
